Didia diehli is a species of snout moth in the genus Didia. It was described by Roesler and Küppers, in 1981, and is known from northern Sumatra.

References

Moths described in 1981
Phycitini